The Beautiful Adventure may refer to:

 The Beautiful Adventure (originally "La belle aventure"), a 1914 play by Gaston Arman de Caillavet, Robert de Flers and Étienne Rey
 The Beautiful Adventure (1917 film), an American silent film, based on the play
 The Beautiful Adventure (1932 German-language film), a film directed by Reinhold Schünzel, based on the play
 The Beautiful Adventure (1932 French-language film), a French-language remake, based on the play
 The Beautiful Adventure (1942 film), a French film, based on the play
 The Beautiful Adventure (1959 film), a West German film